Seong Baek-in (born 7 December 1933) is professor emeritus of linguistics at Seoul National University. His primary area of research is on the Manchu language.

Career
Seong served as a professor at Myongji University from March 1968 to May 1982. The translation of the Tale of the Nisan Shaman into Korean he made while there would prove to be an important reference for its later translation into English. In 1982, Seong moved to Seoul National University, where he held various positions including professor from September 1982 to February 1999, dean of the College of Humanities from September 1995 to August 1997, and head of the Altaic Society of Korea from March 1997 to February 2002.

Outside activities
Seong is a member of the advisory committee for the Korean Language Proficiency Test. In 2004, he was awarded the 26th Oe Sol Prize, established in honour of Choe Hyeon-bae by the Oe Sol Foundation.

Selected publications
. A translation and study of the Tale of the Nisan Shaman.

References

1933 births
Living people
Manchurologists
Academic staff of Seoul National University